Maro Kontou (born 21 June 1934) is a Greek actress and politician. She performed in more than sixty films since 1954.

Selected filmography

References

External links
 

1934 births
Actresses from Athens
Living people
New Democracy (Greece) politicians
Politicians from Athens